Bluenose or Blue nose may refer to:

 Bluenose, a Canadian racing fishing schooner built in 1921
 Bluenose II, replica of the original fishing schooner, built in 1963
 Bluenose one-design sloop, created by the designer of the Bluenose schooner
 MV Bluenose, a CN Marine ferry built in 1955 and scrapped in 2000
 Flying Bluenose, a Dominion Atlantic Railway train from 1891 to 1936
 Bluenose (postage stamp), a 1929 postage stamp issued in Canada
 Blue Nose, a type of American Pit Bull Terrier known for its blue coat
 Bluenose, one of the minor tugboat characters in TUGS
 Bluenose warehou, bluenose sea bass, or bluenose, a fish from the Southern Ocean
 Bluenose cod, an Australian freshwater fish
 Blue-nosed bream, an Australian fish
 The Blue Noses Group, Russian artists group
 Bluenose, a Stan Rogers song from the 1978 album: Turnaround

 Slang 
 Bluenose, a Rangers F.C. fan
 Bluenose, a Birmingham City F.C. fan
 Bluenose, or Bluenoser, a nickname for a person from the Canadian province of Nova Scotia
 Bluenose, American slang expression for a member of the Church of Scotland, recorded since 1698 (Historical Dictionary of American Slang)
 Bluenose, American slang expression from 19th century onward for someone excessively prudish
 Blue Nose, a Line-crossing ceremony for a sailors who cross the Arctic Circle on board a vessel
 The Blue-nosed Bastards of Bodney, the nickname of the World War II 352nd Fighter Group, US Army Air Force, from the identifying markings of their aircraft.